Talant Rysbekovich Dzhanagulov (born 17 October 1989) is a Kyrgyzstani judoka who competed in the super heavyweight division (+100 kg). He was also the nation's flag bearer at the opening ceremony in the 2008 Summer Olympics.

References

External links
 
 Sports Reference – Talant Dzhanagulov
 NBC Olympic Profile

Sportspeople from Bishkek
1989 births
Living people
Kyrgyzstani male judoka
Olympic judoka of Kyrgyzstan
Judoka at the 2008 Summer Olympics
20th-century Kyrgyzstani people
21st-century Kyrgyzstani people